Prime Directive may refer to:
 Prime Directive, the guiding principle of Star Trek'''s Starfleet
 Prime Directive (role-playing game), by the Amarillo Design Bureau
 Prime Directive (album), an album by the Dave Holland Quintet
 Prime Directive (novel), a Star Trek'' novel by Judith and Garfield Reeves-Stevens
 Prime directive (RoboCop), four rules governing the behavior of RoboCop
 A fake working title of the Transformers (film series)